Vervins is a commune in the Aisne department in Hauts-de-France in northern France. It is a subprefecture of the department. It lies between the small streams Vilpion and Chertemps, which drain towards the Serre. It is surrounded by the communes of Fontaine-lès-Vervins, La Bouteille, Landouzy-la-Cour, Thenailles, Hary, Gercy, and Voulpaix. Its population is 2,502 (2015).

Vervins was mentioned as Verbinum in the 3rd century Antonine Itinerary. A Roman theatre has been excavated in the 1870s. The Peace of Vervins was signed here in 1598, ending a war between France and Spain.

Population

See also
 Communes of the Aisne department

References

Communes of Aisne
Subprefectures in France
Aisne communes articles needing translation from French Wikipedia